William Senhouse (died 1505), also called William Sever, was an English priest, successively Bishop of Carlisle, 1495–1502, and Bishop of Durham, 1502–1505.

Senhouse was educated at the University of Oxford and became a Benedictine monk at St Mary's Abbey, York, being elected abbot in 1485. He was selected as bishop of Carlisle on 4 September 1495, and consecrated in 1496. He was translated to Durham on 27 June 1502.

Senhouse died in 1505.

Citations

References
 

Bishops of Durham
Bishops of Carlisle
English Benedictines
Alumni of the University of Oxford
15th-century English Roman Catholic bishops
16th-century English Roman Catholic bishops
15th-century births
Year of birth missing
1505 deaths
15th-century English people
Abbots of St Mary's, York